Twiggy the Water-Skiing Squirrel was an animal novelty act, featuring a squirrel who skis around a heated pool. The act began in 1979 by Chuck and Lou Ann Best and started with an appearance on Real People. It has been featured on numerous television shows, newspaper articles, and websites.

The Bests live in Sanford, Florida. They found an orphaned squirrel after Hurricane David and raised it as a family pet who would ride on their shoulders even as they dipped in the pool. Having purchased a remote-controlled boat for his daughter, Chuck demurred handing over the controls, joking that he had to teach Twiggy to water-ski; the joke was soon taken seriously, albeit with no initial intent of publicity.

Twiggy is actually several gray squirrels who have been trained in succession. The retired squirrels live out their lives as family pets. The squirrels are trained to ride on buoyant foam blocks, which are then towed behind a remote-controlled boat.

Twiggy has appeared in two Frat Pack films, Dodgeball: A True Underdog Story and Anchorman: The Legend of Ron Burgundy. Twiggy has also made an appearance on TV in the movie Down to Earth, Megamind and the music video for Brad Paisley's "River Bank".

The business is now owned and operated by Chuck Best Jr., son of Chuck and Lou Ann.  He starts his tour celebrating the 40th Anniversary while adding Twig Jr and Roxie the Lifeguard to the show.

Lou Ann Best and Twiggy performed their farewell tour in 2018 before retiring the act. The act was re-established by the couple's son Chuck Best Jr., and has performed at the Toronto International Boat Show and Vancouver International Boat Show in 2020 and boat shows in the United States.

References

King of The Hill. 
Episode 5 Season 17
Dale Gribble mentions a “water skiing squirrel” on the news after the weather. Due to the time frame of the show, it is presumed to be a reference to Twiggy.

External links
www.twiggysinc.com - official website

Individual squirrels
Radio control

American water skiers
Deltona, Florida
Individual animals in the United States
Waterskiing